The 1960 William & Mary Indians football team was an American football team that represented the College of William & Mary as a member of the Southern Conference (SoCon) during the 1960 NCAA University Division football season. In their fourth season under head coach Milt Drewer, William & Mary compiled a 2–8 record, with a mark of 1–5 in conference play, placing eighth in the SoCon.

Schedule

References

William and Mary
William & Mary Tribe football seasons
William